Ephedraceae is a family of gymnosperms belonging to Gnetophyta, it contains only a single extant genus, Ephedra, as well as a number of extinct genera from the Early Cretaceous.

Taxonomy 
Ephedraceae is agreed to be the most basal group amongst extant gnetophytes. Members of the family typically grow as shrubs and have small, linear leaves that possess parallel veins. The fossil Ephedraceae genera show a range of morphologies transitional between the ancestral lax male and female reproductive structures and the highly compact reproductive structures typical of modern Ephedra.

Genera 
 Ephedra L. Early Cretaceous-Recent
 Leongathia V.A. Krassilov, D.L. Dilcher & J.G. Douglas 1998 Koonwarra fossil bed, Australia, Early Cretaceous (Aptian)
 Jianchangia Yang, Wang and Ferguson, 2020 Jiufotang Formation, China, Early Cretaceous (Aptian)
 Eamesia Yang, Lin and Ferguson, 2018 Yixian Formation, China, Early Cretaceous (Aptian)
 Prognetella Krassilov et Bugdaeva, 1999 Yixian Formation, China, Early Cretaceous (Aptian) (initially interpreted as an angiosperm)
 Chengia Yang, Lin & Wang, 2013, Yixian Formation, China, Early Cretaceous (Aptian)
 Chaoyangia Duan, 1998 Yixian Formation, China, Early Cretaceous (Aptian)
 Eragrosites Cao & Wu, 1998 Yixian Formation, China, Early Cretaceous (Aptian)
 Gurvanella  Krassilov, 1982 China, Mongolia, Early Cretaceous
 Alloephedra Tao and Yang, 2003 China, Early Cretaceous (considered a synonym of Ephedra by some authors)
 Amphiephedra Miki, 1964 China, Early Cretaceous
 Beipiaoa Dilcher & al, 2001 China, Early Cretaceous
 Ephedrispermum Rydin, K.R.Pedersen, P.R.Crane et E.M.Friis, 2006 Portugal, Early Cretaceous (Aptian-Albian)
 Ephedrites Guo and Wu, 2000 China, Early Cretaceous
 Erenia Krassilov, 1982 China, Mongolia, Early Cretaceous
 Liaoxia Cao et al. 1998 China, Early Cretaceous
 Dichoephedra Ren et al. 2020 China, Early Cretaceous
 ?Pseudoephedra Liu and Wang, 2015 China, Early Cretaceous

References 

Plant families
Ephedraceae